The 1967 Brisbane Rugby League season was the 59th season of the Brisbane Rugby League premiership. Eight teams from across Brisbane competed for the premiership, which culminated in Past Brothers defeating reigning premiers Northern Suburbs 6–2 in the grand final.

Ladder

Finals

Grand Final 
Past Brothers 6 (Goals: Cavanagh 3)

Northern Suburbs 2 (Goals: Lobegeiger)

References 

1967 in rugby league
1967 in Australian rugby league
Rugby league in Brisbane